Abdul Rahman al-Omari (born on December 24, 1972) is a former pilot for Saudi Arabian Airlines. He is known for being mistakenly named by the FBI as the hijacker-pilot of American Airlines Flight 11 in the September 11 attacks.

Biography
He had once worked at JFK Airport.

Wrongly accused
He had moved out of his Vero Beach, Florida residence with his wife and four children on September 3, 2001, but it was quickly shown that he was still alive, and the FBI issued an apology.

Real identity of hijackers
It was quickly determined that Mohamed Atta was the hijacker-pilot among the group of hijackers of American 11. The FBI then named Abdulaziz al-Omari as a hijacker, who may have used the alias "Abdulrahman al-Omari" when boarding American 11, the probable reason the FBI named the wrong Omari.

References

1972 births
Living people
Saudi Arabian aviators
Saudi Arabian emigrants to the United States